The William B. Jordan Farm is a historic farmhouse in Eagleville, Tennessee, U.S..

The farmhouse was built for William B. Jordan, a farmer who owned slaves, from 1847 to 1850. It was designed as an I-house in the Italianate and Greek Revival architectural styles. Moreover, "according to local folklore", the portico was designed by "traveling Italian craftsmen." However, Tennessee State Historian Carroll Van West believes there is no evidence this was the case.

The house has been listed on the National Register of Historic Places since July 13, 1992.

References

Houses on the National Register of Historic Places in Tennessee
Greek Revival architecture in Tennessee
Italianate architecture in Tennessee
Houses completed in 1850
Buildings and structures in Rutherford County, Tennessee